Edward S. Davidson is a professor emeritus in Electrical Engineering and Computer Science at the University of Michigan, Ann Arbor.

Research interests
His research interests include computer architecture, pipelining theory, parallel processing, performance modeling, intelligent caches, and application tuning. In the 1970s, he developed the reservation table approach to optimum design and cyclic scheduling of pipelines, designed and implemented an eight-node symmetric multiprocessor (SMP) system in 1976, and developed a variety of systematic methods for modeling performance and enhancing systems, including early work on simulated annealing, wave pipelining, multiple instruction stream pipelines, decoupled access-execute architecture, and polycyclic scheduling (aka software pipelining). He is a Fellow of the IEEE.

Education
1961 Harvard University, B.A. in Mathematics
1962 University of Michigan, M.S. in Communication Science
1968 University of Illinois, Ph.D. in Electrical Engineering

Teaching
1968–1973 Stanford University, Assistant Professor of Electrical Engineering
1973–1987 University of Illinois at Urbana-Champaign, Professor of Electrical and Computer Engineering
1988–present  University of Michigan, Professor of Computer Science and Engineering

Service
1984-1987 Hardware Design Director, Cedar Parallel Supercomputer at Center for Supercomputing Research at University of Illinois
1988-1990 Chair of the Department of Electrical Engineering and Computer Science, University of Michigan
1994-1997 Director, Center for Parallel Computing, University of Michigan
1997-2000 Associate chair for Computer Science and Engineering, University of Michigan

Awards
1992 IEEE Harry H. Goode Memorial Award for "pivotal seminal contributions to the design, implementation, and performance evaluation of high performance computer systems." 
1996 Taylor L. Booth Education Award for "contributions to the establishment of computer engineering as an academic discipline and for nurturing many leaders of this field during their formative years in the profession.”
2000 IEEE/ACM Eckert-Mauchly Award "for his seminal contributions to the design, implementation, and performance evaluation of high performance pipelines and multiprocessor systems"

References

External links

Official Michigan page

Living people
Year of birth missing (living people)
Harvard College alumni
Stanford University School of Engineering faculty
Grainger College of Engineering alumni
University of Illinois Urbana-Champaign faculty
University of Michigan College of Literature, Science, and the Arts alumni
University of Michigan faculty
Place of birth missing (living people)
Fellow Members of the IEEE